Bishop José Alfredo Caires de Nobrega (born 12 April 1951 in Caniço (Santa Cruz)) is the bishop of the Diocese of Mananjary in Mananjary, Madagascar. He was ordained priest on 28 December 1980 by the Priests of the Sacred Heart congregation. He was appointed and confirmed as bishop in October 2000.

External links
 Profile of Bishop Nobrega

1951 births
Living people
People from Santa Cruz, Madeira
21st-century Roman Catholic bishops in Madagascar
Roman Catholic bishops of Mananjary
Portuguese Roman Catholic bishops in Africa